Los Atlixcos is a volcano in Veracruz, Mexico.

References 

Volcanoes of Veracruz